The San Joaquin & Eastern Railroad (SJ&E) was a standard gauge common carrier railroad that operated in the foothills of the Sierra Nevada Mountains of Fresno County in the U.S. state of California.  The line was abandoned in 1933.  The railroad hauled primarily lumber and agricultural products.

History

The SJ&E was originally built to get men and supplies to the Big Creek Hydroelectric Project sites for the Pacific Light and Power Company (now Southern California Edison).  The track was constructed for $1,055,728 by Stone & Webster Construction Company of Boston, the project's primary contractor. Grading commenced on February 16, 1912 and construction was completed on December 15, 1912.  The 55 mile line started at El Prado (near Friant where it interchanged with the Southern Pacific Railroad. The SP branch continued on to Fresno where it intercepted the SP Mainline. From El Prado the line went east to Auberry and then terminated at Big Creek (Cascade/Cascada).

The railroad was known as the “crookedest railroad in the world”.  The railroad featured 1073 curves up to 60 degrees. The railroad had 43 wooden trestles and 255 steep grades with the steepest at 5.3%.

The railroad was built for the sole reason of building the Big Creek hydroelectric project. When that was essentially complete, the need for the railroad ended. Over the years, it had only earned about 22% of what it cost to build and operate, leading to its nickname "Slow, Jerky, and Expensive. The line was abandoned and dismantled in 1933.

The caption on the picture is incorrect. The SJ&E ended at Big Creek. There was an incline that made it to the site of Huntington Lake for dam construction, but the RR proper never went that far.

Route & Station Stops

El Prado MP 0.0 (near Friant) (Interchange with Southern Pacific Railroad)
McKenzie
Wellbarn MP 16.1
Lodge
Prather this stop was known as Lodge Station in 1914 it is near where Lodge road is today
Auberry MP 26.1 the original road bed is 'SJ and E Rd' today
Indian Mission today it is known as Mono Wind 
Hutchens
Lerona MP 34.9 the original road bed is known as 'Old Railroad Grade Bed Rd' today
White Pine MP 43.0 near Shaver Crossing trestle 
West Portal MP 50.4 (with a 1-mile branch north to Powerhouse 2 on the San Joaquin River)
Dawn Southern California Edison acquired Shaver Lake, and constructed a branch line from this point Shaver to build a new dam. Shaver Lake Railroad
Big Creek (Cascada Station) MP 55.6
Camp 2
Dam 2 (of Huntington Lake)

Passenger Service
The railroad owned 5 passenger cars and the railroad's October 10, 1915 timetable showed an 8:00 a.m. departure from El Prado, arriving at Cascada at 2:25 p.m. The 55 mile trip operating on Mondays, Wednesdays and Fridays and returns on Tuesdays, Thursdays, and Saturdays.  Passenger service continued as late as 1929.  Some of the passenger traffic was attributed to tourists going to the resort at Huntington Lake during the summer.

US Forest Service Fire Patrol
1913 U.S. Forest Service speeder fire patrol operated along the San Joaquin and Eastern Railroad, California. An auto mounted on car wheels and equipped with fire fighting tools.

Locomotives

References

Notes

Defunct California railroads
History of the Sierra Nevada (United States)
History of the San Joaquin Valley
Railway lines opened in 1912
Railway lines closed in 1933
1912 establishments in California